Ectecephala is a genus of grass flies in the family Chloropidae. There are about 6 described species in Ectecephala.

Species
 Ectecephala albistylum Macquart, 1851
 Ectecephala laticornis Coquillett, 1910
 Ectecephala obscura (Schiner, 1868)
 Ectecephala sulcata Sabrosky, 1941
 Ectecephala sulcifrons Coquillett, 1910
 Ectecephala unicolor (Loew, 1863)

References

Further reading

External links

 Diptera.info

Chloropinae